This is a list of the fifty largest cities in Latin America by population residing within city limits as of 2015, the most recent year for which official population census results, estimates or short-term projections are available for most of these cities. These figures do not reflect the population of the urban agglomeration or metropolitan area which typically do not coincide with the administrative boundaries of the city. These figures refer to mid-2015 populations with the exception of Mexican cities, whose figures derive from the 2015 Intercensal Survey conducted by INEGI with a reference date of 15 March 2015.

See also

Notes

References

Cities
Latin America